Hillier Street, is a street in Sheung Wan of Hong Kong Island, Hong Kong, located between Connaught Road Central and Queen's Road Central.

Name 
It was named after Charles Batten Hillier.
Hillier was chief magistrate of Hong Kong from 1847 to 1856, and then took up the consulship to Siam but survived there for only a few months before dying of dysentery.

Roads and streets nearby 
 Sheung Wan station of the MTR
 Wing Lok Street
 Des Voeux Road Central
 Bonham Strand
 Mercer Street
 Burd Street
 Jervois Street
 Kwai Wa Lane

References

Sources
 
 UK in Thailand Embassy history: Charles Batten Hillier
 

Sheung Wan
Roads on Hong Kong Island